Sherandaz Khan (born 7 March 1943) is a former cricketer who played first-class cricket in Pakistan from 1961 to 1977.

A distant cousin of Imran Khan, Sherandaz Khan was an all-rounder who opened the bowling and usually batted in the middle order. He made his first-class debut for Sargodha against Peshawar in the Quaid-e-Azam Trophy in 1961-62. It was also Sargodha’s first-class debut. Khan took 4 for 7 in Peshawar’s first innings, and Sargodha won by an innings.
 
He continued to play for Sargodha, and was instrumental in their second first-class victory, which came in 1969-70 against Lahore A. In the first innings he dismissed Imran Khan, who was making his first-class debut, and went on to take 4 for 55 and 7 for 31 in the match, which Sargodha won by five wickets. In the final of the Punjab Tournament in 1975-76 he top-scored in each innings for Sargodha, scoring 78 and 36, but Lahore won easily.

References

External links

1943 births
Living people
Cricketers from Jalandhar
Sargodha cricketers
Pakistani cricketers
Rawalpindi cricketers
Sherandaz